Kieran O'Neill Dowell (born 10 October 1997) is an English professional footballer who plays as a midfielder for  club Norwich City.

Dowell previously played for Everton, where he had loan spells with other clubs.

Club career

Everton
Born in Ormskirk, Lancashire, Dowell joined Everton's academy at the age of 7. After progressing through the ranks and the reserve side, he signed a scholarship with the club in June 2014. He then scored in a friendly for the Everton U21 side, in a 1–0 win over Rhyl on 26 July 2014.

Dowell made his debut for the club on 11 December 2014, replacing the injured Christian Atsu 11 minutes into a UEFA Europa League group match against FC Krasnodar at Goodison Park. Everton, who had already advanced into the next round, lost 0–1. With his only first team appearances of the season, he signed his first professional contract with the club.

After being given a number 51 shirt in the 2015–16 season, Dowell, however, suffered ankle injury that saw him sidelined for two months. He scored on his return for the Everton U21 on 6 December 2015, in a 3–1 win over Liverpool U23. Dowell went on to score nine more goals for the reserve side, including a stunner against Southampton U21 and a hat-trick against Leicester City U23. On 30 April 2016, he made his Premier League debut as an 87th-minute substitute for Ross Barkley in a 2–1 home win over Bournemouth. Dowell then started the final game of the 2015–16 season against Norwich City at Goodison Park.

Two months after making his Premier League debut, Dowell signed a three-year contract with the club, keeping him until 2019. In the 2016–17 season, Dowell was a member of the Everton U23 squad to win the inaugural Premier League 2 title, in which he made the total of 22 appearances and scoring 5 times. His performance throughout April won him April's Premier League 2 Player of the Month.

Nottingham Forest (loan)
On 3 August 2017, Dowell signed on a season-long loan with Championship side Nottingham Forest.

Dowell made his Nottingham Forest debut, coming on as a second-half substitute, in a 1–0 win over Millwall in the opening game of the season. He scored his first goal for Forest in a 4–3 win at Brentford on 12 August 2017. Since making his Nottingham Forest debut, he became a first team regular. Dowell scored again on 30 September 2017, in a 2–1 win over Sheffield United. Four weeks later, on 28 October 2017, he scored his first ever hat-trick, in a 3–2 win over Hull City. After the match, Dowell's performance was praised by local newspaper Nottingham Post and the club's supporters. However, Mark Warburton was sacked as Forest manager on 31 December 2017 and was replaced by Aitor Karanka. Dowell fell out of favour under the new manager and struggled to hold a place in the starting eleven. He played just 59 minutes during the last eight games of the season.

Sheffield United (loan)
On 28 December 2018, it was announced that Dowell would join Sheffield United as of 2 January 2019 on loan for the rest of the season. On 28 April 2019 United were promoted to the Premier League.

Derby County (loan)
On 11 July 2019, Dowell joined Derby County on a season-long loan.

Wigan Athletic (loan)
On 3 January 2020, Everton cancelled Dowell's loan to Derby and sent him on loan to Wigan for the remainder of the season. On 14 July 2020, Dowell scored a hat-trick as Wigan defeated Hull City by a scoreline of 8–0; the result was Wigan's biggest victory in club history.

Norwich City

On 30 July 2020, Dowell joined Championship club Norwich City on a three-year deal. He scored on his debut for Norwich in a 3–1 EFL Cup defeat to Luton Town on 5 September 2020.

On 1 May 2021, Dowell scored twice as Norwich City defeated Reading 4–1 to secure the Championship title and make an instant return to the Premier League.

Dowell scored his first Premier League goal for Norwich City on 16 April 2022 in a 3-2 loss to Manchester United where he also registered an assist to teammate Teemu Pukki.

International career
After representing England at lower youth levels, Dowell was selected for the England under-20 team for the first time, making his debut in a 1–1 draw against Brazil alongside Everton teammate Dominic Calvert-Lewin. In May 2017, Dowell was selected for the England U20 in the 2017 FIFA U-20 World Cup. After setting up two goals in a 3–0 win over Argentina on Matchday 1 of the group stage, he scored the only goal against hosts South Korea, ensuring a place in the second round for England. He also started in the final, in which England beat Venezuela 1–0 for England's first triumph in a global tournament since their World Cup victory in 1966.

Following the end of the 2017 FIFA U-20 World Cup, Dowell was called up to the England U21 squad, for whom he made his debut in a 1–1 draw with Netherlands U21 on 1 September 2017.

On 27 May 2019, Dowell was included in England's 23-man squad for the 2019 UEFA European Under-21 Championship.

Dowell also qualifies for the Republic of Ireland, under FIFA's grandparent rule.

Personal life
Born in Ormskirk, England, Dowell grew up supporting Everton, the team he would eventually play for, and idolised Mikel Arteta. While at the academy, he was a ball-boy when he was 14. At 20, he moved out of his parents' house for an apartment.

Career statistics

Honours
Norwich City
EFL Championship: 2020–21

England U20
FIFA U-20 World Cup: 2017

England U21
Toulon Tournament: 2018

References

External links

Everton profile
Football Association profile

1997 births
Living people
People from Ormskirk
Footballers from Lancashire
English footballers
England youth international footballers
English people of Irish descent
Association football midfielders
Everton F.C. players
Nottingham Forest F.C. players
Sheffield United F.C. players
Derby County F.C. players
Wigan Athletic F.C. players
Norwich City F.C. players
Premier League players
English Football League players